The 2002 NCAA Division I Field Hockey Championship was the 22nd women's collegiate field hockey tournament organized by the National Collegiate Athletic Association, to determine the top college field hockey team in the United States. The Wake Forest Demon Deacons won their first championship, defeating the Penn State Nittany Lions in the final. The semifinals and championship were hosted by the University of Louisville at Trager Stadium in Louisville, Kentucky.

Bracket

References 

2002
Field Hockey
2002 in women's field hockey
Sports competitions in Louisville, Kentucky
2002 in sports in Kentucky
Women's sports in Kentucky